The Yampa was an American ocean-going cruising schooner yacht for pleasure use from 1887 to 1899. The yacht was originally built for Chester W. Chapin, a rail baron and U.S. Congressman from Massachusetts. It completed several ocean cruises with no accidents. It passed through several hands and ultimately was purchased by Kaiser Wilhelm II of Germany as a birthday present for his wife. He had another larger yacht built based on the design of the Yampa, which was named the Meteor III.

History 

The Yampa was a yacht originally designed by naval architect Archibald Cary Smith for Chester W. Chapin, and the steel-keeled schooner was constructed in 1887 by the firm Harlan and Hollingsworth in Wilmington, Delaware, four years after Chapin died. She was considered the best in her class until 1891. She participated in various events related to the America's Cup, a trophy award for best in a match race between two sailing yachts of different countries.

American banker James Hood Wright used the Yampa for pleasure cruising in the summer of 1894. Chapin sold her that November to Richard Suydam Palmer who had memberships in various yacht clubs, and he refitted her in December 1894. The Yampa sailed for Gibraltar on January 18, 1895, and from there she went to Tunis and Algiers in Africa. She then sailed to Malta and other ports in the Mediterranean Sea. She made several ocean cruises from 1894 through 1895 with no significant accidents, and sailors referred to this as "sea-kindliness." In February 1896, Palmer traveled with the Yampa for three months to the West Indies, stopping at Bermuda, Barbados, Trinidad, St. Thomas, and Nassau. Cuthbert S. Thompson, who was a cousin of Palmer, committed suicide in Bermuda aboard the yacht while Palmer's guest in March on the West Indies trip.  

Palmer took her to Southampton in England in 1897 on the occasion of Queen Victoria's Diamond Jubilee. From there, he went through the North Sea and was towed to Kiel, Germany by way of the Kiel Canal. There the yacht anchored close to the German Emperor's yacht SMY Hohenzollern. The emperor liked the schooner and sought to purchase it. Palmer had left his business card on the SMY Hohenzollern and was informed that the emperor talked all day about how he liked the American vessel. The emperor immediately then took steps to acquire her for himself, and bought the yacht from Palmer in December 1897. The schooner was a birthday present for his wife Augusta Victoria of Schleswig-Holstein. The ship went to Southampton to be refitted to the emperor's luxurious specifications. The German Royal family took many cruises on the Yampa which carried the Empress's flag; she was renamed Iduna and participated in several European regattas. In 1898, she competed in the international Emperor’s Cup regatta. That same year, she was outfitted to race against the schooner Rainbow.

The emperor had another yacht built based on the design of the Yampa, using Smith as the naval architect, and he had the yacht constructed in America instead of Germany. The new vessel Meteor III  was an enlarged and improved version of the Yampa, and was the end result of a sequence of previous vessels designed and built by Smith. Meteor III was built in New York harbor in 1902, and christened by Alice Roosevelt Longworth, the daughter of President Theodore Roosevelt. When the Meteor III was ordered in 1901 the Iduna, previously the Yampa, became the property of the emperor's wife. The Iduna participated in various races into 1909. The Induna and the Meteor III were sold in the early part of 1920 and the proceeds as a wedding present went to German crown prince Wilhelm, the heir to Kaiser Wilhelm II.

See also 
Jefferson (yacht)
Meteor III

References

Sources

External links 

Royal and presidential yachts
1887 ships
Ships built by Harlan and Hollingsworth
Individual sailing yachts
Schooners of the United States
Sailing yachts built in the United States